Sulaimaniyah International Airport  is an airport 14 kilometers (9 miles) outside the city of Sulaimaniyah, in Kurdistan Region, Iraq.

History
Following the removal of Saddam Hussein, the construction of the airport began in November 2003, and it was inaugurated in July 2005. International flights were shut down from 29 September 2017 following a decision taken by the Iraq Civil Aviation Authority (ICAA), but the airport remained open for domestic and humanitarian flights. The international flight ban was lifted in March 2018.

Facilities
The airport has facilities for both cargo and passengers. Sulaimaniyah International Airport has three terminals; for departures, arrivals and VIPs.

Airlines and destinations

See also
 Duhok International Airport
 Erbil International Airport

References

External links
 Sulaimaniyah International Airport
 
 

Airports in Iraq
Airport
Airports in Kurdistan Region (Iraq)
2005 establishments in Iraqi Kurdistan